Thanks for the Memory (Wham Bam Thank You Mam) is a song by the British rock band Slade, released in 1975 as a non-album single. It was written by lead vocalist Noddy Holder and bassist Jim Lea, and produced by Chas Chandler. It reached No. 7 in the UK, remaining in the charts for seven weeks.

Background
"Thanks for the Memory (Wham Bam Thank You Mam)" was Slade's first new single following their film Slade in Flame. Although it later received recognition as one of the greatest rock films of all time, the initial reception towards the film was less positive, particularly from fans who did not expect the film to have such a bleak and sour atmosphere. Following the single release of the film's theme tune, "How Does It Feel", "Thanks for the Memory" was released in May 1975. It reached No. 7 and would be the band's last Top 10 single until 1981's "We'll Bring the House Down". In the first two weeks of release, the single sold 200,000 copies.

"Thanks for the Memory" is notable for its use of keyboard, which, at the time, was new to a Slade single. The part was played on the recording by Lea, after an audition failed to find a session keyboardist who could play the part as the band wanted. In a 1976 interview with Capital Radio, Holder cited the song as one of his favourites. Shortly after its release, Led Zeppelin drummer John Bonham told Lea he liked the song and would loved to have played on it.

Release
"Thanks for the Memory" was released on 7" vinyl by Polydor Records in the UK, Ireland, across Europe, Scandinavia, Yugoslavia, South Africa, Australia, New Zealand and Japan. The B-side, "Raining in My Champagne", was exclusive to the single and would later appear on the band's 2007 compilation B-Sides. Although the song was a non-album single elsewhere, it was included on the United States Warner Bros. Records release of Slade in Flame in 1975.

Promotion
A music video was filmed to promote the single, which was directed by either Gavrik Lasey or Richard Loncraine. The video featured the band performing the song with Holder wearing a red and yellow-spotted jacket and large kipper tie, with guitarist Dave Hill in black studded cowboy-type gear. In the UK, the band performed the song on the music show Top of the Pops and the children's show Shang-a-Lang.

Critical reception
Upon release, Sounds felt the song marked a "considerable change of pace for Slade", but "one of their best". Record Mirror described it as a "very fast, driving single". Melody Maker stated: "It's their best..."

Track listing
7" Single
"Thanks for the Memory (Wham Bam Thank You Mam)" - 4:30
"Raining In My Champagne" - 4:12

Chart performance

Personnel
Slade
Noddy Holder - lead vocals, guitar
Dave Hill - lead guitar, backing vocals
Jim Lea - keyboard, bass, backing vocals
Don Powell - drums

Additional personnel
Chas Chandler - producer

References

Songs about nostalgia
1975 singles
Slade songs
Songs written by Noddy Holder
Songs written by Jim Lea
Song recordings produced by Chas Chandler
1975 songs
Polydor Records singles